Ghadir Habseh (also Romanized as Ghadīr Ḩabseh and Ghadīr-e Ḩabseh; also known as Ghadīr Ḩabeh, Ḩasbeh, and Qadīr-e Ḩabseh) is a village in Mosharrahat Rural District, in the Central District of Ahvaz County, Khuzestan Province, Iran. At the 2006 census, its population was 146, in 30 families.

References 

Populated places in Ahvaz County